Darnac is a former commune in the Haute-Vienne department in the Nouvelle-Aquitaine region in western France. On 1 January 2019, it was merged into the new commune Val-d'Oire-et-Gartempe.

Geography
The river Brame forms all of the commune's northern border, then flows into the Gartempe, which forms all of its western border.

Inhabitants are known as Darnachauds.

See also
Communes of the Haute-Vienne department

References

Former communes of Haute-Vienne